Belafonte Sings of the Caribbean is an album by Harry Belafonte, released by RCA Victor (LPM-1505) in 1957.

It followed his album of calypso music, Calypso (1956), which was a major commercial success in the United States, spending over half a year atop the Billboard Top Pop Albums chart. Although Sings of the Caribbean was less successful, only reaching number 17 on the chart, it nevertheless "consolidated the vogue for calypso". According to Cary Ginell of AllMusic, Belfatone Sings of the Caribbean, being the singer's second set of songs from the West Indies, "expanded the scope in both style as well as geography from the Calypso album", additionally noting the addition of orchestral arrangements.

Track listing

Side one
"Scratch, Scratch" (Harry Belafonte, Lord Burgess) – 2:39
"Lucy's Door" (Traditional, Lord Burgess) – 3:43
"Cordelia Brown" (Lord Burgess, Belafonte) – 2:53
"Don't Ever Love Me" (Burgie) – 2:46
 "Love, Love Alone" (John Hardy) – 3:19
"Cocoanut Woman" (Lord Burgess, Belafonte) – 3:18

Side two
"Haïti Chérie" (Lord Burgess, Belafonte) – 3:18
 "Judy Drownded" (Burgie) – 3:28
"Island in the Sun" (Lord Burgess, Belafonte) – 3:21
 "Angelique-O" (Burgie, William Attaway) – 2:40
"Lead Man Holler" (Lord Burgess, Belafonte) – 4:18

Personnel
Harry Belafonte  – vocals
Millard Thomas – guitar
Frantz Casseus – guitar
Victor Messer – guitar
Production notes:
Joe Carlton – producer
Bob Corman –  orchestra and chorus
D. C. Gunn – cover photo
William Attaway – liner notes

References

1957 albums
Harry Belafonte albums
RCA Victor albums